Thorpe Willoughby is a village and civil parish in the Selby District of  North Yorkshire, England. The village is situated just off the A1238 (a primary road, previously designated A63 prior to the construction of the Selby Bypass) and is in close proximity to Selby.

The village was historically part of the West Riding of Yorkshire until 1974.

History and overview

Thorpe Willoughby has a village public house called "The Fox", a set of local shops with a fish and chip shop, a primary school, a village green and village hall, and a sports field with associated bar. The United Kingdom Census 2001 states the population of Thorpe Willoughby to be 2,822, falling to 2,725 at the 2011 Census.

Scand. Thorp, "an outlying farmstead or hamlet", "a dependent secondary settlement". 1086 Torp, 1276 Thorp Wyleby.

The manorial affix originates from the Willeby family who were resident here in the 13th century. In the Brayton parish register of the 18th century  it is referred to as Thorp.

Like Hambleton, Thorpe Willoughby has a hill to the south of the village, Brayton Barff.  These two prominences appear to be the only high ground in the Vale of York, which is at its widest here, until the land rises towards Hillam and Monk Fryston in the West. Both prominences may represent the remains of "crag and tail" structures from the Wurm glacial episode 10,000 years ago, the Escrick moraine lying further north at York.

References

External links

Parish Council web site
Thorpe Willoughby Primary School
Thorpe Willoughby Childcare Centre

Civil parishes in North Yorkshire
Selby District
Villages in North Yorkshire